Clarence Saunders may refer to:

 Clarence Saunders (grocer) (1881–1953), American grocer, pioneer of supermarkets
 Clarence Saunders (athlete) (born 1963), Bermudian high jumper